Sandy Rosario (born August 22, 1985) is a Dominican former professional baseball pitcher. He has played in Major League Baseball (MLB) for the Florida/Miami Marlins and San Francisco Giants.

Career

Florida Marlins
Rosario signed as an international free agent with the then-Florida Marlins in 2004. He was called up to the Majors for the first time on September 19, 2010, after winning the Southern League championship with the Jacksonville Suns. In his MLB debut on September 23, 2010 against the Milwaukee Brewers, Rosario's first and third pitches thrown were hit as home runs.

The Marlins again promoted Rosario in September 2011. He made four relief appearances, yielding one run over 3 2/3 innings, striking out two and walking two.

Rosario started the 2012 season at the Marlins' Triple-A affiliate New Orleans Zephyrs and later pitched in four games for Miami, yielding six runs in three innings over four relief appearances. He was sent back down to the minors.

Boston Red Sox
After not receiving a September callup, Rosario was claimed by the Boston Red Sox on waivers on October 17, 2012. On November 20, Rosario was designated for assignment along with 4 others.

Oakland Athletics
On November 28, 2012, he was traded to the Oakland Athletics. He only lasted on the roster for a couple weeks.

Second Stint with Red Sox
He was claimed off waivers by the Boston Red Sox on December 10, 2012,

Chicago Cubs
His trip on the waiver wire continued when he was claimed by the Chicago Cubs on December 12.

San Francisco Giants
On December 20, he was claimed off waivers yet again, this time by the San Francisco Giants.
Rosario became a free agent on December 2, 2013 after being non-tendered by the Giants. He was re-signed later that month.

Delfines del Carmen
On February 20, 2015, Rosario signed with the Delfines del Carmen of the Mexican Baseball League. He was released on May 12, 2015.

References

External links

1985 births
Living people
Arizona League Giants players
Dominican Republic expatriate baseball players in Mexico
Dominican Republic expatriate baseball players in the United States
Delfines de Ciudad del Carmen players
Florida Marlins players
Fresno Grizzlies players
Jacksonville Suns players
Jamestown Jammers players
Jupiter Hammerheads players
Gigantes del Cibao players
Greensboro Grasshoppers players
Gulf Coast Marlins players

Major League Baseball pitchers
Major League Baseball players from the Dominican Republic
Mexican League baseball pitchers
Miami Marlins players
New Orleans Zephyrs players
San Francisco Giants players